Amniscus is a genus of beetles in the family Cerambycidae, containing the following species:

 Amniscus assimilis (Gahan, 1895)
 Amniscus praemorsus (Fabricius, 1792)
 Amniscus similis (Gahan, 1895)

References

Acanthocinini